The following people were born in, residents of, or otherwise closely connected to the city of Hamilton, Ontario.

Arts

Architecture and design
 James Balfour (1854–1917), architect; works include Canada Life Assurance Company building at corner of King & James (1883), City Hall on corner of James & York (1888)
 Bruce Kuwabara (b. 1949), architect; works include Kitchener City Hall and Art Gallery of Ontario Phase III
John M. Lyle (1872–1945), architect in the late 19th century; works include New York Public Library Main Branch (1897–1911), Royal Alexandra Theatre in Toronto (1907), Union Station (Toronto) (1914–1921)

Craft 
 Lois Betteridge (1928–2020), silversmith, goldsmith, designer and educator

Dance
Frank Augustyn (b. 1953), principal dancer with the National Ballet of Canada from 1972 to 1989
Karen Kain (b. 1951), principal dancer and later artistic director (2005–2021) of the National Ballet of Canada

Film and television
Jean Adair (1873–1953), actress; worked primarily on stage (sometimes billed as Jennet Adair); made several film appearances late in her career, most notably as one of the misguided murdering aunts of Cary Grant in Arsenic and Old Lace
Nicole Arbour, comedian
David Soren, animator
Julia Arthur (1868–1950), stage and film actress
Robert Beatty (1909–1992), actor who worked in radio, film and television for most of his career and was especially known in the United Kingdom
Alan Best (b. 1959), animation director and producer; began his career as an assistant animator working for Hanna-Barbera studios; also worked on the animated features Heavy Metal (1981) and Pink Floyd The Wall (1982)
 Kylie Bunbury (born 1989), actress
Rick Campanelli (b. 1970), MuchMusic video jockey, currently works for ET Canada
Wendy Crewson (b. 1956), actress
Douglass Dumbrille (1889–1974), actor and Canadian pioneer in early Hollywood
Jesse Ewles (b. 1981), indie film director, writer, creator of music videos for of Montreal, Kathryn Calder, and Grizzly Bear
Rob Faulds (b. 1955), Canadian sports analyst on Rogers Sportsnet and host of sportsnetnews
 Angela Featherstone (born 1965), actress, writer and teacher
Jonathan Frid (1924–2012), theater, television and movie actor, known for the role of the vampire Barnabas Collins on the first incarnation of the Gothic TV serial Dark Shadows
Daniel Goldberg, movie producer of Twins and Space Jam; worked with Ivan Reitman on Stripes and Meatballs
Currie Graham (b. 1967), stage, film and television actor, known for playing Lt. Thomas Bale in the TV program NYPD Blue
Graham Greene (b. 1952), TV and movie actor; born on Six Nations reserve and lived in Hamilton as a young adult; appeared in The Green Mile, on the Red Green Show, L.A. Law and The New Beachcombers
Jonathan Hale (1892–1966), actor, known as Mr. Dithers in the Blondie movies; committed suicide in Hollywood at age 74
Adam J. Harrington (b. 1972), actor and producer; known for his roles in The Secret Circle, Queer As Folk and Dexter, and as Roy Earle in the video game L.A. Noire
Trevor Jimenez, animator (Weekends)
Jason Jones, senior correspondent for The Daily Show with Jon Stewart
Stana Katic (b. 1978), actress, known for her portrayal of Detective Kate Beckett in ABC's Castle
Luke Kirby (b. 1978), actor (Mambo Italiano)
Florence Lawrence (1890–1938), inventor and silent film actress, often referred to as "The First Movie Star"; also known as "The Biograph Girl" and "The Girl of a Thousand Faces"; appeared in more than 270 films for various motion picture companies

Chris Lazar (b. 1986), actor, known for his role as Young Zach on the series Dark Angel
Ashley Leggat (b. 1986), actress, known for her role as "Casey" in the Disney Channel series Life with Derek
Eugene Levy (b. 1946), actor and writer, known for SCTV, Schitt's Creek and the American Pie film series.
Brian Linehan (1944–2004), television host; known for his celebrity interviews on City Lights, a program produced by Citytv in Toronto
Del Lord (1894–1970), film director and actor; known as a director of Three Stooges films (Grimsby)
Patrick McKenna (b. 1960), comedic and dramatic actor; known for the television series The Red Green Show and Traders, and the Trudeau miniseries
 Blake Moynes, winner of the seventeenth season of reality television series The Bachelorette
 Kathleen Munroe (born 1982), actress
 Erin Pitt (born 1999), actress
Paul Popowich (b. 1973), actor; beside his theatre appearances, has performed in many television series (Beverly Hills, 90210) and features
Frank Powell, stage and silent film actor, screenwriter, and director in the United States
Leon Pownall (1943–2006), actor and director
Ivan Reitman (b. 1946), Slovakian-born, Canadian-raised film actor, producer, and director; most remembered for directing and producing a string of comedies, mostly in the 1980s and 1990s (Meatballs, Stripes and Ghostbusters); a founder of the McMaster Film Board at McMaster University
Rick Roberts, actor
Kathleen Robertson (b. 1973), actress, Beverly Hills, 90210
Martin Short (b. 1950), actor, writer, and producer best known for his comedy work, particularly on the TV programs SCTV and Saturday Night Live
Floria Sigismondi (b. 1965), director (born in Pescara, Italy, raised in Hamilton).
Steve Smith (b. 1945), main actor and writer on television series The Red Green Show
Sarah Taylor, MuchMusic VJ who now co-hosts many popular shows, including Combat Zone, MuchOnDemand and Take Over
Dave Thomas (b. 1949), comedian and actor, SCTV, Grace Under Fire
Nerene Virgin, Canadian actress, journalist, and teacher
Brian Williams, sportscaster, known for his coverage of the Olympic Games (born in Winnipeg, raised in Hamilton)
Dick Wilson (1916–2007), actor whose claim to fame was working for over 21 years on 504 Charmin toilet paper TV commercials; also made acting appearances on Bewitched, Hogan's Heroes and The Bob Newhart Show
Gordon Michael Woolvett (b. 1970), actor, played Seamus Harper on TV's Andromeda
Dominic Zamprogna (b. 1979), actor, played James "Jammer" Lyman on TV's Battlestar Galactica
Gema Zamprogna (1976– ), actress, played Felicity King on Road to Avonlea (1989–1996)

Fine arts
Lida Baday (b. 1957), fashion designer
Blaine (1937–2012), political cartoonist
William Blair Bruce (1859–1906), painter
Gino Cavicchioli (b. 1957), official sculptor for the Canadian Football Hall of Fame
Christian Cardell Corbet (b. 1966), portrait sculptor
Hortense Gordon (1886–1961), member of Toronto-based group Painters Eleven; works were exhibited in galleries in Europe and North America
Elizabeth Bradford Holbrook (1913–2009), portrait sculptor; founder of the Canadian Portrait Academy and Canadian Group of Artists; her career spanned over seventy-five years; principal works include eight stone sculpture panels on the former Federal Building
Mark Lewis (b. 1958), photographer and installation artist who represented Canada at the 2009 Venice Biennale
Graeme MacKay (b. 1968), editorial cartoonist
Win Mortimer (1919–1998), comic book and comic strip artist, one of the major illustrators of the DC Comics superhero Superman, Superboy, and Batman
Frank Panabaker (1904–1992), painter
Dave Sim (b. 1956), comic book writer and artist; creator of Cerebus
Paul Szep (b. 1941), editorial cartoonist; two-time Pulitzer Prize winner

Illusionists
Greg Frewin (b. 1967), illusionist and "World Champion of Magic"

Journalism and writing
Roy Adams, author, newspaper columnist, human rights activist and academic
Barbara Amiel, British-Canadian journalist, writer, socialite; wife of Conrad Black
Gordon Stewart Anderson, author
Dick Beddoes (1925–1991), former sports journalist for CHCH-TV in Hamilton, the Vancouver Sun, The Globe and Mail (Toronto), and CFRB radio (Toronto); author
Stephen Brunt, lead sports columnist for The Globe and Mail since 1989
John H. Bryden (b. 1943), politician, journalist, historian
Richard Butler (1834–1925), editor, publisher, journalist; the Butler neighbourhood in Hamilton is named after him
 Jojo Chintoh (b. 1944), retired television reporter (Citytv)
 Jane Christmas (b 1954), writer 
Trevor Cole, newspaper and magazine columnist, novelist
Hugh Cook (b. 1942), novelist
Damien Cox, sports columnist for the Toronto Star
Sylvia Fraser (b. 1935), novelist and travel writer
Lawrence Hill, author (The Book of Negroes)
Wentworth M. Johnson (1939–2014), author
Robert Kirkland Kernighan (1854–1926), poet, journalist; the Kernighan neighbourhood on Hamilton Mountain is named after him
Gary Lautens (1928–1992), humorist and newspaper columnist; wrote for the Toronto Star from 1962 until his death
Mark Leslie (b. 1969), writer, author of Haunted Hamilton: The Ghosts of Dundurn Castle & Other Steeltown Shivers
Billie Livingston (b. 1965), novelist and poet
David Macfarlane (b. 1952), journalist, playwright and novelist
Steve Paikin (b. 1960), journalist, film producer and author, known for hosting TV Ontario's newsmagazines Studio 2 and Diplomatic Immunity
John Lawrence Reynolds (b. 1939), novelist and non-fiction writer, twice winner of the Arthur Ellis Award
Melville Marks Robinson (b. 1888), founder of the Commonwealth Games
Doug Saunders (b. 1967), journalist, European Bureau Chief for The Globe and Mail
James Travers, journalist
Clementina (Fessenden) Trenholme (1844–1918), author, social organizer, and mother of radio pioneer Reginald Fessenden; the Trenholme and Fessenden neighbourhoods on Hamilton Mountain were named after her
David Vienneau (1951–2004), journalist who moved to television in 1998 as Ottawa bureau chief at for Global Television, where he remained until his death from pancreatic cancer
Harriett Annie Wilkins (1829–1888), poet

Music

Nicole Appleton (b. 1974), singer; born in Hamilton but raised in Toronto; one of two Canadian members of the British pop group All Saints, which disbanded in 2001; she and her sister Natalie later formed a second British-based pop group named Appleton
Ian Astbury, singer (The Cult), spent teen years in Hamilton
David Braid (b. 1975), composer and pianist
Boris Brott (1944–2022), once an assistant to Leonard Bernstein, he led the Hamilton Philharmonic Orchestra for 21 years, later creating the Brott Music Festival and National Academy Orchestra
David Byrne (b. 1952), singer-songwriter, guitarist (Talking Heads); lived in Hamilton as a child
Rita Chiarelli, blues singer
Colin Cripps (b. 1961), musician and record producer
Eria Fachin (1960–1996), pop singer
Leila Fletcher (1899-1988), pianist, composer, publisher, music editor and educator.
Jeremy Greenspan (1979- ), electronic pop musician best known for Junior Boys
Jordan Hastings (1982– ), drummer for the post-hardcore band Alexisonfire, as well as The Black Lungs and former band Jersey, born in Hamilton but raised in Burlington
Darcy Hepner, saxophonist, composer arranger.
Udo Kasemets (1919–2014), Estonian-born composer of orchestral, chamber, vocal, piano, and electroacoustic works
Harrison Kennedy (1942– ), electric blues singer and guitarist, formerly part of Chairmen of the Board.
King Biscuit Boy (1944–2003), blues musician, member of Crowbar; the first Canadian blues artist to chart on Billboard in the U.S.; Rolling Stone magazine called him "legendary"; played with Muddy Waters, Joe Cocker, and Janis Joplin; his fans include Keith Richards and Paul McCartney
Daniel Lanois (1951– ), solo artist, producer for U2, lived in Hamilton and recorded at Grant Avenue Studios
Jessy Lanza, pop/electronic musician
Gord Lewis (1956/1957–2002), guitarist for Teenage Head
Wade MacNeil (1984– ), guitarist and vocalist for the post-hardcore band Alexisonfire and frontman of The Black Lungs
Brian Melo, winner of Canadian Idol (season five); previously a construction worker
Haydain Neale (1970–2009), musician (jacksoul)
Steve Negus, Saga drummer and record producer
Neil Peart (1952–2020), drummer and lyricist for the progressive rock band Rush
Skip Prokop (1946–2017), drummer and bandleader for Lighthouse and The Paupers; worked with Cass Elliot, Janis Joplin, Al Kooper and Carlos Santana
Stan Rogers (1949–1983), folk singer
Brenda Russell (1949– ), American-born singer-songwriter and keyboardist who lived in Hamilton; known for her eclectic musical style; her genres include pop, soul, jazz and adult contemporary; has worked with Stevie Wonder, Aretha Franklin and Sting
Lorraine Segato, lead vocalist for 1980s new wave music group Parachute Club, noted for the song "Rise Up"
 Ernest Seitz (1892–1978), composer, songwriter, pianist and music educator
Dan Snaith (1979– ), musician for the bands Caribou, Manitoba and Daphni, born in Dundas
Tomi Swick, singer-songwriter
Christian Tanna, drummer and songwriter for I Mother Earth
Jagori Tanna, guitar player for I Mother Earth
Ian Thomas (1950– ), singer-songwriter known for the 1973 hit "Painted Ladies"; brother of Dave Thomas
Alan Walker (1930– ), English-Canadian radio producer, musicologist and academic best known as a biographer and scholar of composer Franz Liszt
Jackie Washington (1919–2009), blues singer
Robert Stanley Weir (1856–1926), lawyer, poet, author, best remembered as the author of the English lyrics to "O Canada"
Simon Wilcox (1976– ), songwriter based in Los Angeles
Tom Wilson, rock musician

Pageantry
Leanne Baird, Miss Canada International in 1998
Venessa Fisher (1986– ), Miss Universe Canada 2004; from Waterdown

Radio
Richard Alway, former radio broadcast commentator, current and first lay President and Vice-Chancellor of the University of St. Michael's College
Bob Bratina, radio personality, elected MP for Hamilton East-Stoney Creek, former City Councillor for Downtown Ward 2 and Mayor of Hamilton
Roy Green, staple of the Hamilton radio scene
Sue Prestedge, sports broadcaster, one of Canada's first and most influential female sports journalists. Now Program Coordinator of the Advanced Journalism program at Mohawk College.

Theatre
Nick Cordero (1978–2020), Broadway actor
Diane Dupuy, founder of the Famous People Players in 1974, a professional black light theatre company that combines music with characters that pay tribute to the music and artistry of famous people; the group was discovered by Liberace, who took them to Las Vegas to perform; they have been performing around the world ever since
Sky Gilbert (1952– ), artistic director, actor, academic and drag performer; opened the Hammertheatre Company in January 2007 in Hamilton; the theatre is devoted to Gilbert's plays, which deal with issues of gender and sexuality

Business

Aris Alexanian (1901–1961), founder of Alexanian Carpet and Flooring (born in what is now Turkey, moved to Hamilton in 1927)
John Askin (1739–1815), fur trader, merchant and official in Upper Canada
Hugh Cossart Baker, Sr. (1818–1859), banker, businessman, mathematician; established the first life insurance company in Canada (1847), the Canada Life Assurance Company
Hugh Cossart Baker, Jr. (1846–1931), businessman, telephone pioneer
David Braley (1941–2020), CFL B.C. Lions owner since 1996-97, Hamilton businessman who owns Orlick Industries Limited
Jack Kent Cooke (1912–1997), one of the most widely known executives in professional sports; at one time owned the NHL's Los Angeles Kings, the NBA's Los Angeles Lakers and the NFL's Washington Redskins
 James Crooks (1778–1860), Scottish-born businessman of Wentworth County and father of Adam Crooks; Crooks Street in Central Hamilton is named after him
Michael DeGroote (1932–2022), billionaire, best known as a major private donor to McMaster University
John Dickenson (1847–1932), contractor and political figure; one of the "Five Johns" of the Dominion Power and Transmission Company
 James Durand (1775–1833), businessman and political figure in Upper Canada
Stephen Elop (b. 1963), President & CEO of Nokia, the first non-Finnish director of the company
John Fortino (1934–2011), founder of Fortinos Supermarkets
Ron Foxcroft (b. 1947), owner of Fluke Transport; NCAA basketball referee; inventor of the pea-less Fox 40 whistle; motivational speaker; "Foxy" was named Hamilton Citizen of the Year in 1997
Peter George (1941–2017), economist and university administrator, formerly president of McMaster University in Hamilton
Peter Hess (1779–1855), farmer, landowner; Peter and Hess Streets in the city are named after him, and Caroline Street is named after one of his daughters
Joseph Hobson (1834–1917), Canadian land surveyor, civil engineer, and railway design engineer
Nathaniel Hughson (1755–1837), farmer and hotel owner; Loyalist who moved to Canada following the American Revolution; one of the city founders of Hamilton; Hughson Street is named after him
Peter Hunter Hamilton (1800–1857), landowner and businessman; half brother of city founder George Hamilton; Hunter Street is named after him
Edward Jackson (1799–1872), tinware manufacturer; Jackson Street is named after him
James Jolley (1813–1892), saddler, harnessmaker, politician; funded construction of the Jolley Cut, a Mountain access road in Hamilton
Ron Joyce (1930–2019), Founding partner of Tim Hortons
Charles Juravinski (1929–2022), former owner of Flamboro Downs racetrack; donated $43 million to Hamilton city hospitals with his wife Margaret; Henderson Hospital on Concession Street was renamed to the Juravinski Hospital and Juravinski Cancer Centre
Michael Lee-Chin (b. 1951), CEO of AIC Diversified Canada Split Corp. and the National Commercial Bank of Jamaica
John Moodie Jr. (1859–1944), textile manufacturer; drove the first automobile in Canada in 1898, a one-cylinder Winton he imported from Cleveland, Ohio
Gordon Osbaldeston (b. 1930), former civil servant; in 1981 he was made an Officer of the Order of Canada and was promoted to Companion in 1997
Joseph Pigott, head of a family construction business that built Hamilton landmarks including City Hall, the Pigott Building, Copps Coliseum and Christ the King Cathedral
Andrew Ross (1857–1941), businessman; lent his support to the building of the Tivoli theatre and to the Barton Street Arena; was involved in professional hockey (Hamilton Tigers) and softball
 William Rymal (1759–1852), farmer and one of the earliest settlers on the Hamilton Mountain; Rymal Road is named after him
E.D. Smith (1853–1948), businessman and politician who founded a food company that bears his name
Ken Soble, founder of CHCH-TV, leader of Hamilton's urban renewal movement, and owner of CHML radio
William Southam (1843–1932), once an apprentice printer at the London Free Press; at age 34 he purchased the troubled Hamilton Spectator, turned it around and made it the flagship of a national newspaper chain
Harry Stinson (b. 1953), real estate developer and president of Stinson Properties; called Toronto's "condo king"; now resides in Hamilton
Thomas Stinson (1798–1864), merchant, banker, landowner; an extensive landowner in not only in Hamilton but also Chicago, St. Paul, Minnesota, and Superior City, Wisconsin, which he named
George Elias Tuckett (1835–1900), Tuckett Tobacco Company owner and Hamilton's 27th mayor in 1896
Bob Young, founder of Red Hat 1996, started a self-publishing website that claims to be the world's fastest-growing provider of print-on-demand books (www.lulu.com); currently owns the Hamilton Tiger Cats of the CFL (Ancaster)
Joyce Young, philanthropist

Education
 Adelaide Hoodless (1858–1910), educational reformer who founded the international women's organization known as the Women's Institutes in 1897

Law

Crime
 Johnson Aziga (b. 1956), first person charged with first-degree murder in Canada for spreading the HIV virus, after two women whom he had infected without their knowledge died
 Evelyn Dick (b. 1920), committed infanticide and was convicted, then acquitted, of having murdered her husband
 Giacomo Luppino (1900–1987), mobster of the Hamilton-based Luppino crime family
 Angelo Musitano (1978–2017), mobster of the Hamilton-based Musitano crime family
 Pat Musitano (1968–2020), mobster of the Hamilton-based Musitano crime family
 Johnny Papalia (1924–1997), mobster of the Hamilton-based Papalia crime family
 Rocco Perri (1887–disappeared 1944), gangster
 Cathy Smith (b. 1947), singer; convicted of manslaughter in death of John Belushi, co-authored the book Chasing the Dragon about her life experience with drugs (1984)

Judges and lawyers

Charles William Bell (1876–1938), playwright, politician and Rocco Perri's lawyer
Alan Borovoy (1932–2015), lawyer and human rights activist
Harvey Brownstone (1956– ), judge of the Ontario Court of Justice
Richard Hatt (1769–1819), businessman, judge and political figure in Upper Canada
Helen Kinnear (1894–1970), lawyer, first federally appointed woman judge in Canada
Helen Gregory MacGill (1864–1947), first woman in British Columbia to be appointed a judge of the juvenile court, a post she held for 23 years
Jack Pelech (1934– ), litigation and business lawyer, Hamilton Citizen of the Year, 1987; Order of Canada, 2006
John Sopinka (1933–1997), Supreme Court Justice described as the heart of the court; raised in north Hamilton and died unexpectedly; namesake of Hamilton's courthouse and the Sopinka Cup, a law student advocacy competition
John Willson (1776–1860), judge and political figure in Upper Canada

Military
Nathan Cirillo (1990–2014), Corporal of the Argyll and Sutherland Highlanders of Canada; slain while on ceremonial guard duty at the National War Memorial during the 2014 shootings at Parliament Hill, Ottawa
William W. Cooke (1846–1876), military officer in the United States Army during the American Civil War and the Black Hills War; adjutant for George Armstrong Custer and was killed during the Battle of the Little Bighorn; buried in Hamilton Cemetery
Harry Crerar (1888–1965), commander of the First Canadian Army in the Second World War
John Weir Foote (1904–1988), military chaplain and Ontario cabinet minister, Canadian recipient of the Victoria Cross; The James Street Armoury where the RHLI is now based, along with 11th Field Hamilton-Wentworth Battery, was renamed the John W. Foote VC Armoury in his memory
Billy Green (1794–1877), otherwise known as "The Scout", key to the Anglo-Canadian victory at the Battle of Stoney Creek
Robert Land (1736–1818), veteran of the American Revolution and one of Hamilton's founding citizens; Robert Land Academy, Canada's only military pre-university private school, was named in his honour
Ben Lear (1879–1966), Olympic bronze medal winner, United States Army World War II-era general
Sydney Chilton Mewburn (1863–1956), lawyer and politician; Minister of Militia and Defence from 1917 to 1920 under Sir Robert Borden's Union Government in 1917
Harold A. Rogers (1899–1994), founder of Kin Canada (formerly the Kinsmen and Kinette Clubs of Canada), a non-profit service organization that promotes service, fellowship, positive values, and national pride
John Vincent (1764–1848), British army officer in the Battle of Stoney Creek, War of 1812

Politics

Dominic Agostino (1959–2004), member of Provincial Parliament of Ontario for Hamilton East from 1995 until his death in 2004; the first Liberal MPP in that riding since 1967
Lincoln Alexander (1922–2012), the 24th Lieutenant-Governor of Ontario from 1985 to 1991 and former Governor of the Canadian Unity Council; became Canada's first black Member of Parliament when he was elected to the House of Commons of Canada in 1968 as a member of the Progressive Conservative Party of Canada; an expressway on Hamilton Mountain was named the Lincoln Alexander Parkway in his honour
Thomas Bain (1834–1915), speaker of the House of Commons
Richard Beasley (1761–1842), soldier, political figure, farmer and businessman in Upper Canada
Marie Bountrogianni (1956– ), Ed.D., a former member of the Legislative Assembly of Ontario, and cabinet minister in the government of Liberal Premier Dalton McGuinty
Isaac Buchanan (1810–1883), businessman and political figure in Canada West
Sarmite Bulte (1953– ), Latvian-Canadian lawyer, advocate and politician; member of the Liberal Party; represented the Toronto riding of Parkdale-High Park in the House of Commons through three successive parliaments from 1997 to 2006
Richard Butson (1922–2015), medical officer and politician (Ancaster)
Ivan John "Jack" Cable (1934– ), politician and the former Commissioner of the Yukon (2000–2005)
Chris Charlton (1963– ), MA, Member of Parliament in the 2006 federal election for Hamilton Mountain
David Christopherson (1954– ), represents the riding of Hamilton Centre in the House of Commons (2004– )
Mark Coakley, Hamilton-based activist, lawyer, author and chair of Environment Hamilton
Sheila Copps (1952– ), PC, HBA, LL.D (hc), journalist and former politician; a second-generation member of a political family that has dominated Hamilton-area politics on the municipal, provincial and federal levels
Victor K. Copps (1919–1988), politician and Mayor of Hamilton; the city's landmark sports arena, Copps Coliseum (now FirstOntario Centre) was named in his honour
Adam Crooks (1827–1885), LLB, an Ontario Member of the Legislative Assembly of Ontario for Toronto West, 1871–1874; moved to the riding of Oxford South, 1875–1886; MLA for the Ontario Liberal Party
Thomas Mayne Daly, Sr. (1827–1885), businessman and political figure in Canada West (later Ontario); represented the riding of Perth North in the House of Commons and in the Ontario Provincial Parliament
Ellen Fairclough (1905–2004), first female member of the Canadian Cabinet; the Ellen Fairclough Building in Hamilton is named after her
Colin Campbell Ferrie (1808–1856), Hamilton's first Mayor
Rolf Gerstenberger, president of the United Steelworkers Local 1005 at Stelco's Hilton Works in Hamilton; prominent member of the Communist Party of Canada (Marxist–Leninist)
Sir John Morison Gibson (1842–1929), lawyer, politician, businessman, Lieutenant Governor of Ontario 1908–1914
George Hamilton (1788–1836), settler and city founder
Sir John Strathearn Hendrie (1857–1923), Lieutenant Governor of Ontario from 1914 to 1919
Adam Inch (1857–1933), dairy farmer, politician; Inch Park neighbourhood on Hamilton Mountain is named after him
Stan Keyes (Stanley Kazmierczak Keyes) (1953– ), diplomat and former politician
Sam Lawrence (1879–1959), mayor and pioneer of Labour rights in Hamilton
 William Findlay Maclean (1854–1929), politician, Conservative MP for York East and York South, served for 34 years
 Allan MacNab (Sir Allan Napier MacNab) (1798–1862), soldier, lawyer, businessman, knight and former Prime Minister of Upper Canada; MacNab Street in Hamilton is named after him
Quinto Martini (politician) (1908–1975), first Italian Canadian elected to Parliament, where he represented Hamilton East from 1957 until he was defeated by Liberal John Munro in 1962
Catherine McKenna (1971– ), MP for Ottawa Centre, Minister of Infrastructure and Communities
James McMillan (1838–1902), U.S. Senator from the state of Michigan
Thomas McQuesten (1882–1948), athlete, militiaman, lawyer, politician and government appointee who lived in Hamilton; helped encourage McMaster University to relocate from downtown Toronto to west Hamilton in 1930
Bob Morrow (1946–2018), longest-serving mayor in Hamilton's history (1983–2000); selected to serve as an interim councillor for Ward Three in 2014
John Munro (1931–2003), PC, BA, LL.B, politician, elected to the House of Commons in the 1962 election; Hamilton's "John Munro International Airport" is named after him
Devan Nair, 3rd President of Singapore who moved to the United States after his presidency, but later moved to Hamilton, where he died in 2005
Father Sean O'Sullivan, politician and religious leader
 Saul Rae (1914–1999), diplomat
 Allan Rowe (1955–2015), member of the Nova Scotia Legislative Assembly
 William Eli Sanford (1838–1899), businessman, philanthropist, and politician
Charles Stewart (1868–1946), politician, Premier of Alberta from 1917 to 1921 (Wentworth County)
Allan Studholme (1846–1919), stove maker and first Ontario Labour MLA
James Lyle Telford (1889–1960), mayor of Vancouver, B.C. 1939–40 (Valens)
James Walker (b. 1874), politician in Alberta, and a municipal councillor in Edmonton

Religion
Michael Baldasaro (1949–2016), Church of the Universe leader
Charles Coughlin (1891–1979), priest and radio personality
John Dunjee (1833–1903), freed slave, pastor
John Christie Holland (1882–1954), became an ordained minister in 1924 and served as pastor of Hamilton's Stewart Memorial Church; in 1953 he was honoured as Hamilton's Citizen of the Year, the first African Canadian given that recognition

Science
 James Arthur (born 1944), mathematician
 Douglas Barber (1938– ), businessman, founder and former President and CEO of ennum Corp
 Manjul Bhargava (1974– ), mathematician, born in Hamilton; one of the recipients of the 2014 Fields Medal.
 Bertram Brockhouse (1918–2003), Nobel Prize-winning physicist
Robert N. Clayton (1930–2017), geochemist
John Charles Fields (1863–1932), mathematician and the founder of the Fields Medal for outstanding achievement in mathematics, considered by some to be the Nobel Prize in Mathematics
 Campbell Leckie (1848–1925), engineer; Leckie Park neighbourhood on Hamilton Mountain is named after him
 Louis Nirenberg (1925–2020), mathematician, born in Hamilton; known for work on partial differential equations, especially as applied to the Navier–Stokes problem
William Parks (1868–1939), geologist and paleontologist, following in the tradition of Lawrence Lambe
 John Rae (1813–1893), physician and polar explorer
Myron Scholes (b. 1941), Nobel Prize-winning economist

Invention
Troy Hurtubise (1963–2018), inventor of a prototype for a lightweight armour shell for military purposes that conjures up an image of a Star Wars Imperial stormtrooper
George Klein (1904–1992), often called the most productive inventor in Canada in the 20th century; inventor of electric wheelchairs, microsurgical staple gun, the ZEEP nuclear reactor and the Canadarm
Steve Mann, inventor of wearable computers who teaches electrical and computer engineering at the University of Toronto
Simon Sunatori (1959– ), engineer, inventor and entrepreneur, best known for the invention of the MagneScribe and the Magic Spicer
Thomas Willson (1860–1915), inventor; designed and patented the first electric arc lamps

Medicine

Elizabeth Bagshaw (1881–1982), physician and birth control activist
John C Bell (1953– ), cancer researcher at the OHRI, developer of oncolytic viral therapies
David G. Benner, clinical psychologist and author
John Callaghan (1923–2004), cardiologist who pioneered open-heart surgery
Harold E. Johns (1915–1998), medical physicist, noted for his extensive contributions to the use of ionizing radiation to treat cancer
James Fraser Mustard (1927–2011), physician, scientist, and founding member of the McMaster University Faculty of Medicine
Sir William Osler (1849–1919), 1st Baronet, the "father of modern medicine" (Dundas)
David Sackett (1934–2015), founded the Department of Clinical Epidemiology at McMaster University
The Honourable William Winegard (1924–2019), educator, engineer, scientist and former Member of Parliament

Sports

Basketball
 Kia Nurse (1996– ), Phoenix Mercury and the Canadian national team
Shona Thorburn (1982– ), WNBA pro basketball player, currently playing for the Seattle Storm; attended Westdale Secondary School in Hamilton
Shai Gilgeous-Alexander (1998– ), NBA player for the Oklahoma City Thunder, selected by the Charlotte Hornets (1st round, 11th overall) in the 2018 NBA draft, before being traded to the Los Angeles Clippers the same day. Shai was then traded to the Oklahoma City Thunder in July 2019.

Boxing
Jackie Callura (1914–1993), featherweight boxer, World Featherweight Champion of 1943
Jessica Rakoczy (1977– ), boxer, 2005 WBC Lightweight Champion

Figure skating
Toller Cranston (1949–2015), figure skater who won the Olympic bronze medal in 1976
Bryce Davison (1986– ), figure skater, competed in the pairs event with Jessica Dubé; member of the Hamilton Skating Club; Davison and Dube were Canadian champions three times;they were world bronze medallists in 2008; they finished 6th at the Olympics and World Championships in 2010, their last competitive season
 Wendy Griner (born 1944), figure skater

Football
John Bonk (1950– ), four-time All-Star offensive lineman in the Canadian Football League, played from 1973 to 1985 for the Winnipeg Blue Bombers
Less Browne (1959– ), CFL defensive back for Hamilton, Winnipeg, Ottawa and B.C.; holds the CFL and all-pro records for most interceptions in a career with 87; resides in Hamilton
Bob Cameron (1954– ), played 23 seasons (1980–2002) with the Winnipeg Blue Bombers of the Canadian Football League
Steve Christie (1967– ), ex-placekicker in the NFL; holds a Super Bowl record for longest field goal kicked, at 54 yards
Tommy Joe Coffey, Canadian Football League receiver who played for the Hamilton Tiger-Cats; currently resides in Burlington
Ben D'Aguilar (1989– ), former professional Canadian Football League defensive lineman for the Calgary Stampeders and Hamilton Tiger-Cats
Peter Dalla Riva (1946– ), former professional Canadian football player with the Montreal Alouettes of the Canadian Football League at the tight end and wide receiver positions; three-time CFL Allstar
Bernie Faloney (1932–1999), star quarterback football player in the United States and Canada
Rudy Florio (1950– ), Canadian football player
Corey Grant (1976– ), former wide receiver for the Saskatchewan Roughriders and Hamilton Tiger-Cats of the Canadian Football League (Stoney Creek)
Russ Jackson (1936– ), Canadian football quarterback, all-time pass leading Canadian quarterback, three Grey Cups with the Ottawa Rough Riders
Larry Jusdanis (1970– ), Canadian football quarterback
Joe Krol (1919–2008 ), Canadian football quarterback (1932–53), Lou Marsh Trophy winner as Canada's top athlete in 1946
Ron Lancaster (1938–2008), former football player, coach and general manager in the Canadian Football League (CFL) and sports announcer for CBC Television
Jesse Lumsden (1982– ), former running back with Hamilton, Edmonton, and Calgary of the Canadian Football League and McMaster University alumnus
Spencer Moore (1990– ), fullback for the Saskatchewan Roughriders of the Canadian Football League; won the 47th Vanier Cup with the McMaster Marauders and the 101st Grey Cup with the Saskatchewan Roughriders
Mike Morreale (1971– ), award-winning receiver in the Canadian Football League
Rocco Romano, CFL's DeMarco-Becket Memorial Trophy winner in 1994 and 1996 for the Calgary Stampeders, awarded originally to the player selected as the outstanding lineman in the West Division; inducted into the Canadian Football Hall of Fame in 2007
Ralph Sazio, player, coach, GM and president of the Hamilton Tiger-Cats; won four Eastern finals and three Grey Cups as coach from 1963 to 1967
Vince Scott (1925–1992), played for the Hamilton Tiger-Cats; later a Hamilton city councillor
Jim Young (1943– ), former pro American football and Canadian football player

Golf
Bobbi Lancaster, a trans woman who reached notoriety playing in the LPGA Qualifying Tournament in 2013

Ice hockey

Dave Andreychuk (1963– ), 2004 Stanley Cup champion; holds the NHL record for most career power-play goals (274)
Syl Apps (1915–1998), Toronto Maple Leafs captain who led the Leafs to three Stanley Cups; 1936-37 Calder trophy winner (top NHL rookie); 1941-42 Lady Byng Trophy winner; McMaster University Alumni (Paris, Ontario)
Paul Beraldo (1967– ), retired hockey centre
Allan Bester (1964– ), retired NHL hockey goalie, Toronto Maple Leafs
Andy Brown (1944– ), credited with being the last pro goaltender to play barefaced; last played NHL hockey for the Pittsburgh Penguins
David Brown (1985– ), Notre Dame Fighting Irish hockey goalie; named team MVP in 2006; named (CCHA); Central Collegiate Hockey Association's Player-of-the-week three times in 2007; favorite to win the 2007 Hobey Baker Award, which is awarded to the top collegiate player in the United States; a Pittsburgh Penguins draft pick in 2004
Frank Caprice (1962– ), retired NHL hockey goalie, six seasons with Vancouver Canucks (1982–88)
Ben Chiarot (1991– ), defenseman for the Montreal Canadiens of the NHL
Joe Cirella (1963– ), retired NHL defenseman, 821 games played, No. 5 pick overall in 1981 NHL Entry Draft by the Colorado Rockies
Sebastian Cossa (2002– ), ice hockey goaltender for the Detroit Red Wings
Dave Dryden (1941– ), retired NHL hockey goalie, 201 NHL games for Buffalo, Edmonton, Chicago and NY Rangers; created (and was the first goaltender to employ) the modern-day goaltending mask consisting of a fiberglass mask with a cage
Ken Dryden (1947– ), retired NHL hockey goalie, elected to the Hockey Hall of Fame in 1983
Blake Dunlop (1953– ), retired NHL hockey player, winner of the 1980–81 Bill Masterton trophy
Cecil "Babe" Dye (1898–1962), NHL hockey player, its top goal scorer of the 1920s; inducted into the Hockey Hall of Fame in 1970; nicknamed "Babe" because he was considered to be 'the Babe Ruth of hockey'
Don Edwards (1955– ), retired NHL hockey goalie, winner of the Vezina trophy in 1979–80
Ryan Ellis (1991- ), defensemen for the Philadelphia Flyers of the NHL
Nelson Emerson (1967– ), retired NHL hockey player
Ray Emery (1982–2018), NHL hockey goalie
 Laura Fortino (born 1991), ice hockey player
Tyrone Garner (1978– ), played for Calgary Flames as goaltender (born in Stoney Creek)
Ben Harpur (born 1995), NHL player for the New York Rangers
Todd Harvey (1975– ), NHL hockey player
Red Horner (1909–2005), NHL hockey defenseman; helped Toronto Maple Leafs win their first Stanley Cup in 1932
Tim Horton (1930–1974), NHL hockey defenseman; opened his first Tim Hortons Donut Shop in Hamilton in 1964
Harry Howell (1932–2019), NHL hockey defenseman, winner of the 1966–67 James Norris Trophy
Willie Huber (1958– ), retired NHL hockey defenseman; born in (Germany) and grew up in Hamilton
Dick Irvin Sr. (1892–1957), NHL hockey player, former head coach of Toronto Maple Leafs and Montreal Canadiens
 Mark Jankowski (born 1994), ice hockey centre
Al Jensen (1958– ), retired NHL hockey goalie, winner of the 1983–84 William Jennings trophy
Derek King (1967– ), retired NHL hockey player
Jamie Macoun (1961– ), retired NHL hockey defenseman who played 1,128 NHL games
Adam Mair (1979– ), NHL hockey player
Brian McGrattan (1981– ), NHL hockey player for the Phoenix Coyotes; NHL enforcer
Marty McSorley (1963– ), retired NHL hockey player infamous for his assault of Donald Brashear in a game on 21 February 2001
Ron Murphy (1933– ), retired NHL player who played in 889 games
Ric Nattress (1962– ), retired NHL hockey defenseman
Darnell Nurse (1995– ), current NHL player with the Edmonton Oilers; first round draft pick for the Edmonton Oilers; gold medal winner at the 2015 World Junior Ice Hockey Championship
Murray Oliver (1937– ), retired NHL hockey player, played in 1,127 NHL games
George Owen (1901–1986), retired NHL hockey defenceman for the Boston Bruins; served as the Bruins captain in the 1931–32 season; first player credited with wearing a helmet in his rookie season in 1928
Keith Primeau (1971– ), retired NHL hockey player; born in Toronto and grew up in Hamilton
Pat Quinn (1943–2014), retired NHL hockey player, former head coach of the Toronto Maple Leafs, Vancouver Canucks, Los Angeles Kings and the Philadelphia Flyers
Leo Reise Jr. (1922– ), retired NHL hockey defenseman; 494 games played in the 1940s and 1950s for Detroit, Chicago and NY Rangers
Zac Rinaldo (1990– ), ice hockey player for the Nashville Predators
Rick Smith (1948– ), retired NHL hockey defenseman; 687 games played; No. 7 pick in 1966 NHL Entry draft by the Boston Bruins
Steve Staios (1973– ),Retired NHL hockey defenseman, Current GM of the Hamilton Bulldogs
Danny Syvret (1985– ), NHL hockey defenseman who spent his junior career with the London Knights of the OHL, eventually being named team captain; in his final year of junior hockey, he was captain of a powerhouse team that broke numerous junior hockey records and won the 2005 Memorial Cup (Millgrove)
John Tonelli (1957– ), retired NHL hockey player; 1984 Canada Cup MVP
Arber Xhekaj (2001– ), NHL player for the Montreal Canadiens

Running
Robert Kerr (1882–1963), Irish-Canadian sprinter; won the gold medal in the 200 metres and the bronze medal in the 100 metres at the 1908 Summer Olympics
Ray Lewis (1910–2003), track & field, first Canadian-born black Olympic medalist
William Sherring (1878–1964), athlete, winner of the marathon race at the 1906 Summer Olympics

Soccer

Valerio Alesi (1966– ), first Canadian-born player in Serie A Soccer
Bob Bearpark (1943–1996), soccer head coach
Ian Bennett (1985– ), soccer player who currently plays for the Milwaukee Wave of the Major Indoor Soccer League
Nick Bontis (1969– ), soccer player and coach elected President of Canada Soccer in November 2020
Milan Borjan (1987– ), goalkeeper (Red Star Belgrade, Canadian national soccer team), born in Yugoslavia and raised in Hamilton
Alex Bunbury (1967– ), played four seasons with the Hamilton Steelers (CSL) 1987–90; voted Best Foreign Player in the Portuguese first division club Maritimo in the 1994–95 season, where he scored 12-goals; a Canadian Soccer Hall-of-Fame inductee in 2006; his son is fellow Hamiltonian soccer star Teal Bunbury
Teal Bunbury (1990– ), played for the Canadian U17 and U20 teams, as well as the US's U23 team, and national squad; has played professionally for the Sporting Kansas City since 2010; his father is fellow Hamiltonian soccer star Alex Bunbury
Jamie Dodds (1981– ), soccer player who played for the Toronto Lynx in the USL First Division
Rhian Dodds (1979– ), midfielder for Kilmarnock F.C. (Scottish soccer)
Milan Kojic (1976– ), soccer player who currently plays for the F.K. Haugesund in Adeccoligaen
Robert McDonald (1902–1956), soccer player from the 1920s and 1930s who spent a decade playing for famous Scottish football club Rangers
John McGrane, played nine North American Soccer League seasons and 17 times for the Canadian national soccer team in 'A' internationals; played in the Montreal Olympics; in 2008 he was inducted into Canada's Soccer Hall of Fame
Jimmy Nicholl (1956– ), Northern Irish football player, 73 International caps
 Ryan Raposo (1999– ), forward for Vancouver Whitecaps FC
Greg Sutton (1981– ), Canadian International Soccer goalkeeper (Toronto FC)
Melissa Tancredi (1977– ), Canadian soccer forward who currently plays for Dalsjöfors GoIF and Canada's National Women's team; won an Olympic bronze medal at the 2012 Olympics

Thoroughbred horse racing

Hamilton is the birthplace of three jockeys in Thoroughbred horse racing whose success led to them being inducted in the Canadian Horse Racing Hall of Fame:
 Jeffrey Fell
 Chris Rogers
 Don Seymour

Wrestling
Johnny K-9 (Ion William Croitoru) (1963–2017), four years in the WWF, including a match against Hulk Hogan
Billy Red Lyons, ex-pro wrestler and TV announcer for Maple Leaf Wrestling
Angelo Mosca (1938– ), Canadian Football League player between 1958 and 1969 with the Hamilton Tiger-Cats, better known for his pro wrestling career
Johnny Powers (1943– ), ex-pro wrestler, two-time NWF World champion (1970, 1973)
"Big John" Quinn (1944– ), retired professional wrestler who competed in North American regional promotions including NWA All-Star Wrestling, Pacific Northwest Wrestling and Stampede Wrestling during the 1960s and early 1970s; cousin of former NHL coach and Hamiltonian Pat Quinn
Dewey Robertson (1939–2007), "The Missing Link," ex-pro wrestler
George Scott (1929–2014), professional wrestler, brother and tag partner of Sandy Scott
Sandy Scott (1934–2010), former professional wrestler, brother and tag partner of George Scott
Iron Mike Sharpe Jr. (1951–2016), ex-pro wrestler, self-proclaimed "Canada's Greatest Athlete"
Tonya Verbeek (1977– ), first Canadian woman to medal at the Olympics in wrestling, the silver medal at the 2004 Summer Olympics in women's wrestling in the 55 kg category; at the 2008 Summer Olympics, she won Canada's third medal overall, and the third Canadian medal ever in women's wrestling, a bronze in the 55kg class(Grimsby ON)
Ethan Page (1989-) born Julian Micevski, Born and raised in Stoney Creek. Currently signed to All Elite Wrestling.

Other sports
Doug Didero (1960– ), race car driver
Eleanor Harvey (1995– ), foil fencer; Won gold at the 2015 Pan American Games and represented Canada at the 2016 Summer Olympics.
Melanie Hawtin (1988– ), wheelchair racer and wheelchair basketball player.
Ray Lazdins (1964– ), retired discus thrower, represented Canada twice at the Summer Olympics
Irene MacDonald (1931–2002), Canada's champion diver from 1951 to 1961; won medals at the 1954 and 1958 Commonwealth Games and in 1956 she won Canada's first Olympic diving medal, a bronze
Joanne Malar (1975– ), former freestyle and medley swimmer; competed in three consecutive Summer Olympics
Luke McGrath (1993– ), a rugby union scrum-half for Leinster Rugby and the Ireland national rugby union team.
Pat Messner (1954– ), water skier, winner of the 1972 Summer Olympics bronze
Frank O'Rourke (1894–1986), ex-pro baseball player and long time New York Yankees scout
Chrissy Redden (1966– ), cross-country mountain biker
Linda Thom (1943– ), women's shooting (25m pistol) gold at the 1984 Summer Olympics

Miscellaneous
Alexander Aitchison, first full-time fire chief of Hamilton
Étienne Brûlé (1592–1633), probably the first European to visit what is now Hamilton in 1616
Marion Stinson Crerar (1859–1919), clubwoman and WWI worker
 Regan Russell (1955-2020), Canadian animal rights activist
Eileen Vollick (1908–1968), aviator; first Canadian woman to earn a private pilot's certificate

References

 
Hamilton
Hamilton